The 2005 Berlin Thunder season was the seventh season for the franchise in the NFL Europe League (NFLEL). The team was led by head coach Rick Lantz in his second year, and played its home games at Olympic Stadium in Berlin, Germany. They finished the regular season in first place with a record of seven wins and three losses. In World Bowl XIII, Berlin lost to the Amsterdam Admirals 27–21.

Offseason

Free agent draft

Personnel

Staff

Roster

Schedule

Standings

Game summaries

Week 1: vs Frankfurt Galaxy

Week 2: vs Hamburg Sea Devils

Week 3: at Amsterdam Admirals

Week 4: at Rhein Fire

Week 5: vs Amsterdam Admirals

Week 6: at Cologne Centurions

Week 7: vs Rhein Fire

Week 8: at Hamburg Sea Devils

Week 9: at Frankfurt Galaxy

Week 10: vs Cologne Centurions

World Bowl XIII

Notes

References

Berlin
Berlin Thunder seasons